Volcano the Bear are an improvisational/experimental English band formed in Leicester in 1995. The group's members are Aaron Moore (drums, trumpet, vocals), Nick Mott (saxophone, guitar, vocals), Clarence Manuelo (tapes, electronics) and Daniel Padden (keyboards, guitar, clarinet, vocals). Although the principal roles of each member are as listed, the group use a large array of additional sound-making objects to create their music.

Early work
Their early work was characterised by theatrical live performances and unconventional recording methods; for example The One Burned Ma, their second full-length album, contains no tracks on which all four members appear. Having self-released a handful of cassettes and CD-Rs, several as every short-run limited editions with hand-drawn inserts, they came to the attention of Steven Stapleton of Nurse With Wound, who revived his United Dairies imprint to release The Inhazer Decline, their first full-length album. However, a proposed collaboration with Nurse With Wound was not completed. They continued to release regular live CDRs on their own Volucan imprint, and later albums such as Five Hundred Boy Piano and much of The Idea of Wood were performed live in the studio.

Hiatus
A hiatus in group activity occurred in the early part of the 2000s with Mott and Moore reviving their pre-Volcano the Bear unit Songs of Norway. Manuelo created an album and EP as Earthtrumpet. Padden founded The One Ensemble of Daniel Padden initially as a solo project, later expanded to a quartet, with Chris Hladowski and Aby Vulliamy (both of Nalle), and Peter Nicholson. This unit has subsequently issued its releases as "The One Ensemble", with Padden releasing an album in 2006 of his solo material under his own name. Padden has also played with the Glasgow Improvisers Orchestra.

Moore played drums on the 1999 L.P. Free Surf Music #1 by Alan Jenkins and The Thurston Lava Tube, drummed for The Nightingales for a while, and in 2005 formed the duo Dragon or Emperor with occasional VtB collaborator Stewart Brackley. He also released a solo album The Accidental on which Alex Neilson and Andrew Liles appear. He is currently a member of the Brooklyn band Freetime.

Reunification
In early 2006 the band reconvened to release a double album Classic Erasmus Fusion to excellent reviews, and later that year released a live recording of their first performance as a full band in four years entitled Egg and Two Books.

The band released their first album for five years, Golden Rhythm / Ink Music, in April 2012.

Musical style
The band's music has been described as "avant-garde drone rock", "avant rock", and on the album 500 Boy Piano British folk influences were noted. Their 2012 album Golden Rhythm / Ink Music was described as pushing "well beyond the boundaries of rock music, incorporating elements of Middle Eastern music, American freak folk, jazz, and Dadaist literary absurdity". They have been compared with The Residents, Nurse With Wound, and Faust among others.

Discography

Compilation appearances
Lactamase Bonus Compilation

References

External links
Volcano the Bear at brainwashed.com
One Ensemble of Daniel Padden at brainwashed.com
Interview with Volcano The Bear (2008)
Beta-lactam Ring Records
Review of Five Hundred Boy Piano at losingtoday.com

English experimental musicians
People from Leicester
Rune Grammofon artists
Misra Records artists